The word Ivoirité (sometimes translated into English as Ivoirity) was first used by Henri Konan Bédié in 1995. It initially referred to the common cultural identity of all those living in Côte d'Ivoire, especially foreigners in Ivory Coast (who represent one third of the population). 

During the Presidency of Henri Konan Bédié, however, the term entered the social and political lexicon of the country, and was used as a descriptor of the purported intrinsic characteristics of an indigenous Ivorian, in contrast to immigrants. During Bedie's presidency, ethnic tensions rose sharply, with growing attacks on foreign workers and a widening rift between the country's pre-dominantly Muslim north and mainly Christian south. His government tried to define who was Ivorian. 

Before the 1995 and the 2000 elections, a law drafted by Henri Konan Bédié and upheld by the Supreme Court required both parents of a presidential candidate to be born within Côte d'Ivoire. This led to the disqualification of the northern presidential candidate Alassane Ouattara, who claimed to represent the predominantly Muslim north, often poor immigrant workers from Mali and Burkina Faso working on coffee and cocoa plantations. Alassane Ouattara, an economist who worked for the IMF, was the Prime Minister of Côte d'Ivoire under the President Félix Houphouët-Boigny.

This word is associated with the civil war in Côte d'Ivoire that occurred in 2010–2011, in which at least 3,000 civilians were killed.

References

Ivorian culture
Society of Ivory Coast
Ivorian nationalism